Rigelj pri Ortneku is a small settlement in the hills west of Ortnek in the Municipality of Ribnica in southern Slovenia. The entire Municipality of Ribnica is part of the traditional region of Lower Carniola and is included in the Southeast Slovenia Statistical Region.

Name
The name of the settlement was changed from Rigelj to Rigelj pri Ortneku in 1953. In the past the German name was Rigl.

References

External links
Rigelj pri Ortneku on Geopedia

Populated places in the Municipality of Ribnica